Edgerson is a surname. Notable people with the surname include:

Booker Edgerson (born 1939), American football player
Eugene Edgerson (born 1978), American basketball player